The Italian Patent and Trademark Office (in Italian, Ufficio Italiano Brevetti e Marchi, or UIBM) is an office of the Italian Ministry of Economic Development. Its mission is to control the issue of patents and the registration of trademarks in Italy. The UIBM is based in Rome.

External links

Patent offices